Warren Hill is an area within the market town of Arnold in the English ceremonial county of Nottinghamshire. Located in the civil parish of St. Albans, it is in the local government district of Gedling. The surrounding areas include Top Valley to the south, Rise Park to the west, Arnold and the suburb of Redhill to the east and Bestwood Country Park and Bestwood Village to the north. Most of the area consists of newly built housing estates with mainly 3-4 bedroom semi-detached houses as well as some newly built terraced housing and bungalows.

Facilities
The area has a primary school as well as a secondary school; The Warren Academy and The Oakwood Academy. The area also has the Emmanuel Church (of the Church of England) located off Church View Close, as well as a community church located next to the Warren Academy off Muirfield Road. The community church may be scheduled to be demolished.

Bus services

References

External links
St. Albans Parish Council website

Gedling